Buck Mountain is a mountain in the Adirondack Mountains region of New York. It is located southwest of Tupper Lake in Hamilton County. The Buck Mountain Fire Observation Station is located on top of the mountain. On June 21, 2021, the Hamilton County Board of Supervisors announced that the tower would soon be reopened to the public.

History
The Buck Mountain Fire Observation Station is a  Aermotor LS40 tower that was erected by Whitney Park circa 1933. On April 11, 2006, the International Paper Company, signed an agreement to sell all its land in the Adirondack Park to Lyme Timber Company for $137 million dollars. On June 21, 2021 the Hamilton County Board of Supervisors announced that the tower would soon be reopened to the public. Cedar Heights Timber, LLC has agreed with the county to enter into a 10 year agreement to open the fire tower to the public.

External links
The Fire Towers of New York

References

Adirondacks
Tourist attractions in Hamilton County, New York
Mountains of Hamilton County, New York
Mountains of New York (state)